A list of people, who died during the 15th century, who have received recognition as Blessed (through beatification) or Saint (through canonization) from the Catholic Church:

See also 

Christianity in the 15th century

15
 Venerated
 Christian saints
Lists of 15th-century people